Çeltikli can refer to:

 Çeltikli, Bismil
 Çeltikli, Bitlis
 Çeltikli, Haymana